Bhagwanpur railway station is a railway station on the Muzaffarpur–Hajipur section in East Central Railway under Sonpur railway division of Indian Railways. The railway station is situated at Kiratpur Raja Ram, Bhagwanpur in Vaishali district of the Indian state of Bihar.

References

Railway stations in Vaishali district
Sonpur railway division